Novik is a gender-neutral Belarusian surname, its Russian counterpart is Novikov, and Polish counterpart Nowik. Notable people with the surname include:
 
 Aaron Novik (born 1974), American composer, clarinetist and bandleader
 Alyaksandr Novik (born 1975), Belarusian football player
 Alyaksandr Novik (footballer, born 1994), Belarusian professional footballer
 Anton Novik (born 1998), Belarusian professional footballer
 Isabella Novik, American mathematician
 Mary Novik, Canadian novelist
 Maryna Novik (born 1984), Belarusian javelin thrower 
 Morris S. Novik (1903–1996), Russian-American pioneer in radio
 Naomi Novik (born 1973), American novelist of Polish origins
 Syarhey Novik (born 1993), Belarusian football player 
 Tatiana Novik (born 1994), Russian pair skater
 Uladzislau Novik (born 1995), Belarusian track cyclist
 Vitaly Novik (born 1994), Belarusian football player

See also
 Novick, a surname

Belarusian-language surnames